Naked Came the Stranger is an American adult erotic film released in 1975. The film was directed by Radley Metzger (as "Henry Paris") and filmed in several elaborate locations in New York City.

Plot
Gilly, a radio host, is determined to enjoy herself with friends and acquaintances as much as her playful husband Billy. Gilly enjoys herself in several locations around New York City, including at an elaborate dress ball, an old-fashioned ballroom and on the top floor of a double-decker bus while it drives around the city.

Cast

 Alan Marlow as Marvin Goodman
 Darby Lloyd Rains as Gilly
 David Savage as a Waiter
 Gerald Grant as Taylor
 Helen Madigan as an Actress
 Kevin Andre as Party Guy
 Levi Richards as Billy
 Mary Stuart as Phyllis
 Rita Davis as a Waitress
 Joe Negroni as Harold Harold

Notes
The film Naked Came the Stranger was based on the 1969 hoax book of the same name and released  during the Golden Age of Porn (inaugurated by the 1969 release of Andy Warhol Blue Movie) in the United States, at a time of "porno chic", in which adult erotic films were just beginning to be widely released, publicly discussed by celebrities (like Johnny Carson and Bob Hope) and taken seriously by film critics (like Roger Ebert).

According to one film reviewer, Radley Metzger's films, including those made during the Golden Age of Porn (1969–1984), are noted for their "lavish design, witty screenplays, and a penchant for the unusual camera angle". Another reviewer noted that his films were "highly artistic — and often cerebral ... and often featured gorgeous cinematography". Film and audio works by Metzger have been added to the permanent collection of the Museum of Modern Art (MoMA) in New York City.

Remastered version
In 2011, DistribPix released a complete remastering of the film, with the full cooperation of the director. The result had a limited exhibition in theaters, but the main outcome of the project was the first-ever official remastered DVD version. A listing of the music on the film soundtrack was released earlier.

See also

 Andy Warhol filmography
 Erotic art
 Erotic films in the United States
 Erotic photography
 Golden Age of Porn
 List of American films of 1975
 Sex in film
 Unsimulated sex

References

Further reading
 
 Heffernan, Kevin, "A social poetics of pornography", Quarterly Review of Film and Video, Volume 15, Issue 3, December 1994, pp. 77–83. .
 Lehman, Peter, Pornography: film and culture, Rutgers depth of field series, Rutgers University Press, 2006, .
 Williams, Linda, Hard core: power, pleasure, and the "frenzy of the visible", University of California Press, 1999, .

External links
 Naked Came The Stranger at  MUBI (related to The Criterion Collection)
 
 
 Naked Came The Stranger at Amazon.com
 Naked Came The Stranger – 2011 restoration at DistribPix

American erotic films
Films based on American novels
Films directed by Radley Metzger
1975 films
1970s pornographic films
Films shot in New York City
1970s English-language films
1970s American films